The Short S.32 was a British four-engined all-metal long-range transport monoplane designed by Short Brothers to Air Ministry Specification 14/38. The project was abandoned in May 1940. If produced, it would have been one of the first British pressurised airliners.

Development
In 1938 the British Air Ministry issued two specifications (14/38 and 15/38) for large transport aircraft comparable in size with the Junkers Ju 90 and Focke-Wulf Fw 200, with Specification 14/38 being for use on Empire routes and 15/38 for European routes. The Ministry placed a contract with Shorts for three prototypes designated the Short S.32 against specification 14/38 and a production order for 14 Fairey FC1s against specification 15/38.

The S.32 was a four-engined mid-wing monoplane powered by Bristol Hercules radials. The S.32 had a tailwheel landing gear to overcome problems with a nose wheel retracting into a pressurised fuselage. The build of three prototypes for the Air Ministry was started at Rochester but due to the urgent need for the factory to build the Short Stirling construction was abandoned.

Specifications

See also

References

1930s British airliners
S.32
Abandoned civil aircraft projects of the United Kingdom
Mid-wing aircraft